Jāzeps Vītols Latvian Academy of Music, formerly the Riga Conservatory, is a higher education establishment of music at 1 Barona Street, Riga, Latvia. The junior institute is the Emīls Dārziņš Music School.

History

Latvian Conservatory of Music was founded in 1919 by the Latvian composer Jāzeps Vītols, who also became the first director of the Latvian National Opera. He remained director until 1944, excepting 1935-1937 when the director was his choral assistant Pauls Jozuus. There were junior and senior courses that covered around 9 to 10 academic years. Beginning in 1940, the structure of the conservatory changed: the lower junior courses were transferred in secondary education system and later became a base for Jāzeps Mediņš's and Emīls Dārziņš's secondary schools of music. And there formed up courses of higher school in the conservatory. Beginning 1 October 1951 LPSR Institute of Theater was joined to the conservatory, reorganizing it to a faculty of theater with departments of acting and directing. In May 1958 it was renamed to the Jāzeps Vītols Latvian conservatory. In January 1964 conservatory had been renamed to J.Vītols Latvian institute of Art, but in July 1964 institute was renamed back to J.Vītols Latvian conservatory.

Organization

Departments
The Academy is divided into the following departments:

 Piano Department
 Department of Accompanists
 Department of Compulsory Piano
 Department of Chamber Ensemble and Piano Accompaniment
 Department of String Instruments
 Department of Wind Instruments
 Department of Jazz Music
 Department of Orchestra Conducting
 Department of Choir Conducting
 Department of Vocal Music
 Department of Early Music
 Department of Choreography
 Department of Music Education
 Department of Instrument Performance Teaching
 Department of Music Technology
 Department of Composition
 Department of Musicology
 Department of Humanities
 Department of Science and Research
 Department of Self-Financed Studies
 Department of Doctoral Studies

Notable teaching staff
The following have served as Academy Rectors:
 Jāzeps Vītols (1919—1935)
 Pauls Jozuus (1935—1937)
 Alfrēds Kalniņš (1944–1948)
 Jēkabs Mediņš (1948–1950)
 Jānis Ozoliņš (1951–1977)
 Imants Kokars  (1977–1990)
 Juris Karlsons (1990–2007)
 Artis Sīmanis (2007-)

Lūcija Garūta taught composition and music theory from 1940 and was elected to the professorship in 1960.

During the republic, the State Conservatory had only one Jewish professor of music, Adolf Metz, head of the violin department. Many Jewish students emigrated to Lithuania.

Notable alumni

 Misha Alexandrovich, cantor
 Iveta Apkalna, pianist and organist
 Volfgangs Dārziņš
 Sarah Feigin
 Elīna Garanča, mezzo-soprano
 Inese Galante, soprano
 Jānis Ivanovs, composer

 Arvīds Jansons
 Olga Jegunova, pianist
 Oleg Kagan, violinist
 Aivars Kalējs, organist and composer
 Gidon Kremer, violinist
 Kristīne Opolais, soprano
 Raimonds Pauls

 Uģis Prauliņš
 Uldis Pūcītis, actor
 Alfred Strombergs, conductor, vocal coach, and pianist
 Aleksandrs Viļumanis, conductor
 Imants Zemzaris
 Ēriks Ešenvalds, composer

References

External links
 

Jāzeps Vītols Latvian Academy of Music
Educational institutions established in 1919
Buildings and structures in Riga
1919 establishments in Latvia